The Lights Out Tour was a co-headlining concert tour by American R&B recording artists Kelly Rowland and The-Dream. It was launched in support of Rowland's fourth studio album Talk a Good Game and The-Dream's fifth studio album IV Play. The tour kicked off on May 26, 2013 in Washington, D.C. and ended on June 2, 2013 in Mashantucket. The tour was originally scheduled to have twenty-two shows, but this was later changed to five, after Rowland was forced to cancel many of the shows because she signed on to become a judge on The X Factor US.

Shows

Cancelled shows

See also

List of Kelly Rowland live performances

References

Kelly Rowland concert tours
2013 concert tours
Co-headlining concert tours